Crystal violet or gentian violet, also known as methyl violet 10B or hexamethyl pararosaniline chloride, is a triarylmethane dye used as a histological stain and in Gram's method of classifying bacteria. Crystal violet has antibacterial, antifungal, and anthelmintic (vermicide) properties and was formerly important as a topical antiseptic. The medical use of the dye has been largely superseded by more modern drugs, although it is still listed by the World Health Organization.

The name gentian violet was originally used for a mixture of methyl pararosaniline dyes (methyl violet), but is now often considered a synonym for crystal violet. The name refers to its colour, being like that of the petals of certain gentian flowers; it is not made from gentians or violets.

Production
A number of possible routes can be used to prepare crystal violet. The original procedure developed by the German chemists Kern and Caro involved the reaction of dimethylaniline with phosgene to give 4,4′-bis(dimethylamino)benzophenone (Michler's ketone) as an intermediate. This was then reacted with additional dimethylaniline in the presence of phosphorus oxychloride and hydrochloric acid.

The dye can also be prepared by the condensation of formaldehyde and dimethylaniline to give a leuco dye:
CH2O + 3 C6H5N(CH3)2 → CH(C6H4N(CH3)2)3 + H2O
Second, this colourless compound is oxidized to the coloured cationic form (hereafter with oxygen, but a typical oxidizing agent is manganese dioxide, MnO2):
CH(C6H4N(CH3)2)3 + HCl +  O2 → [C(C6H4N(CH3)2)3]Cl + H2O

Dye colour

When dissolved in water, the dye has a blue-violet colour with an absorbance maximum at 590 nm and an extinction coefficient of 87,000 M−1 cm−1. The colour of the dye depends on the acidity of the solution. At a pH of +1.0, the dye is green with absorption maxima at 420 nm and 620 nm, while in a strongly acidic solution (pH −1.0), the dye is yellow with an absorption maximum at 420 nm.

The different colours are a result of the different charged states of the dye molecule. In the yellow form, all three nitrogen atoms carry a positive charge, of which two are protonated, while the green colour corresponds to a form of the dye with two of the nitrogen atoms positively charged. At neutral pH, both extra protons are lost to the solution, leaving only one of the nitrogen atoms positive charged. The pKa for the loss of the two protons are approximately 1.15 and 1.8.

In alkaline solutions, nucleophilic hydroxyl ions attack the electrophilic central carbon to produce the colourless triphenylmethanol or carbinol form of the dye. Some triphenylmethanol is also formed under very acidic conditions when the positive charges on the nitrogen atoms lead to an enhancement of the electrophilic character of the central carbon, which allows the nucleophilic attack by water molecules. This effect produces a slight fading of the yellow colour.

Applications

Non-medical

Crystal violet is used as a textile and paper dye, and is a component of navy blue and black inks for printing, ball-point pens, and inkjet printers. It is sometimes used to colourize diverse products such as fertilizer, antifreeze, detergent, and leather.

The dye is used as a histological stain, particularly in Gram staining for classifying bacteria. 

When conducting DNA gel electrophoresis, crystal violet can be used as a nontoxic DNA stain as an alternative to fluorescent, intercalating dyes such as ethidium bromide. Used in this manner, it may be either incorporated into the agarose gel or applied after the electrophoresis process is finished. Used at a 0.001% concentration and allowed to stain a gel after electrophoresis for 30 minutes, it can detect as little as 16 ng of DNA. Through use of a methyl orange counterstain and a more complex staining method, sensitivity can be improved further to 8 ng of DNA. When crystal violet is used as an alternative to fluorescent stains, it is not necessary to use ultraviolet illumination; this has made crystal violet popular as a means of avoiding UV-induced DNA destruction when performing DNA cloning in vitro.

In biomedical research, crystal violet can be used to stain the nuclei of adherent cells. In this application, crystal violet works as a intercalating dye and allows the quantification of DNA which is proportional to the number of cells.

In forensics, crystal violet was used to develop fingerprints. Crystal violet is also used as a tissue stain in the preparation of light microscopy sections. In laboratory, solutions containing crystal violet and formalin are often used to simultaneously fix and stain cells grown in tissue culture to preserve them and make them easily visible, since most cells are colourless. It is also sometimes used as a cheap way to put identification markings on laboratory mice; since many strains of lab mice are albino, the purple colour stays on their fur for several weeks.

In body piercing, gentian violet is commonly used to mark the location for placing piercings, including surface piercings.

Marking blue, used to mark out pieces in metalworking, is composed of methylated spirits, shellac, and gentian violet.

Medical
Gentian violet has antibacterial, antifungal, antihelminthic, antitrypanosomal, antiangiogenic, and antitumor properties. It is used medically for these properties, in particular for dentistry, and is also known as "pyoctanin" (or "pyoctanine"). It is commonly used for:
 Marking the skin for surgery preparation and allergy testing;
 Treating Candida albicans and related fungal infections, such as thrush, yeast infections, various types of tinea (ringworm, athlete's foot, jock itch);
 Treating impetigo; it was used primarily before the advent of antibiotics, but still useful to persons who may be allergic to penicillin.

In resource-limited settings, gentian violet is used to manage burn wounds, inflammation of the umbilical cord stump (omphalitis) in the neonatal period, oral candidiasis in HIV-infected patients and mouth ulcers in children with measles.

Veterinary

Because of its antimicrobial activity, it is used to treat ich in fish. However, it usually is illegal to use in fish intended for human consumption.

Biological research
Crystal violet can be used as an alternative to Coomassie brilliant blue (CBB) in staining of proteins separated by SDS-PAGE, reportedly showing a 5x improved sensitivity vs CBB.

History

Synthesis
Crystal violet is one of the components of methyl violet, a dye first synthesized by Charles Lauth in 1861. From 1866, methyl violet was manufactured by the Saint-Denis-based firm of Poirrier et Chappat and marketed under the name "Violet de Paris". It was a mixture of the tetra-, penta- and hexamethylated pararosanilines.

Crystal violet itself was first synthesized in 1883 by Alfred Kern (1850–1893) working in Basel at the firm of Bindschedler and Busch. To optimize the difficult synthesis which used the highly toxic phosgene, Kern entered into a collaboration with the German chemist Heinrich Caro at BASF. Kern also found that by starting with diethylaniline rather than dimethylaniline, he could synthesize the closely related violet dye now known as C.I. 42600 or C.I. Basic violet 4.

Gentian violet
The name "gentian violet" (or Gentianaviolett in German) is thought to have been introduced by the German pharmacist Georg Grübler, who in 1880 started a company in Leipzig that specialized in the sale of staining reagents for histology. The gentian violet stain marketed by Grübler probably contained a mixture of methylated pararosaniline dyes. The stain proved popular and in 1884 was used by Hans Christian Gram to stain bacteria. He credited Paul Ehrlich for the aniline-gentian violet mixture. Grübler's gentian violet was probably very similar, if not identical, to Lauth's methyl violet, which had been used as a stain by Victor André Cornil in 1875.

Although the name gentian violet continued to be used for the histological stain, the name was not used in the dye and textile industries. The composition of the stain was not defined and different suppliers used different mixtures. In 1922, the Biological Stain Commission appointed a committee chaired by Harold Conn to look into the suitability of the different commercial products. In his book Biological Stains, Conn describes gentian violet as a "poorly defined mixture of violet rosanilins".

The German ophthalmologist Jakob Stilling is credited with discovering the antiseptic properties of gentian violet. He published a monograph in 1890 on the bactericidal effects of a solution that he christened "pyoktanin", which was probably a mixture of aniline dyes similar to gentian violet. He set up a collaboration with E. Merck & Co. to market "Pyoktanin caeruleum" as an antiseptic.

In 1902, Drigalski and Conradi found that although crystal violet inhibited the growth of many bacteria, it has little effect on Bacillus coli (Escherichia coli) and Bacillus typhi (Salmonella typhi), which are both Gram-negative bacteria. A much more detailed study of the effects of Grübler's gentian violet on different strains of bacteria was published by John Churchman in 1912. He found that most Gram-positive bacteria (tainted) were sensitive to the dye, while most Gram-negative bacteria (not tainted) were not, and observed that the dye tended to act as a bacteriostatic agent rather than a bactericide.

Precautions
One study in mice demonstrated dose-related carcinogenic potential at several different organ sites. The Food and Drug Administration in the US (FDA) has determined that gentian violet has not been shown by adequate scientific data to be safe for use in animal feed. Use of gentian violet in animal feed causes the feed to be adulterated and is a violation of the Federal Food, Drug, and Cosmetic Act in the US. On June 28, 2007, the FDA issued an "import alert" on farm raised seafood from China because unapproved antimicrobials, including gentian violet, had been consistently found in the products. The FDA report states:

"Like MG (malachite green), CV (crystal violet) is readily absorbed into fish tissue from water exposure and is reduced metabolically by fish to the leuco moiety, leucocrystal violet (LCV). Several studies by the National Toxicology Program reported the carcinogenic and mutagenic effects of crystal violet in rodents. The leuco form induces renal, hepatic and lung tumor in mice."

Health Canada recently found medical devices that use gentian violet to be safe for use but recommended to stop using all drug products that contain gentian violet, including on animals, causing Canadian engineering schools to revisit the usage of this dye during orientation.

In popular culture
In Catch-22, the medics are portrayed as using gentian violet on feet and gums as a panacea.

In the novel Picnic at Hanging Rock, the orphan Sara recounts how she was once punished by an orphanage's matron, who 'painted my head with gentian violet'.

Engineering students in Canada use gentian violet to dye their skin and jackets, a tradition started in honour of naval engineers whose purple armbands would leave their skin dyed after countless days spent in the boiler rooms. Another story being that purple was the colour of the Titanics engineers who stayed behind to delay the sinking of the ship.

See also

 Methyl green
 Methyl violet
 Fluorescein
 Prussian blue
 Egyptian blue
 Methyl blue
 Methylene blue
 New methylene blue
 Han purple
 Potassium ferrocyanide
 Potassium ferricyanide

References

Further reading
 .

External links
 .

Triarylmethane dyes
Antifungals
Anilines
Disinfectants
Staining dyes
PH indicators
Chlorides
Dimethylamino compounds